S78 may refer to:
 S78 (New York City bus) serving Staten Island
 County Route S78 (California)